The 2009 Race of Champions was the 22nd running of the event, and took place on November 3–4, 2009 at the Beijing National Stadium in Beijing, China. It was the first time that the event took place outside of Europe and Africa. It was also the first international sports event to be held in the "Bird's Nest" stadium since the 2008 Summer Olympics.

The event also moved from a weekend to a midweek slot for the first time. The RoC Nations Cup took place on Tuesday, November 3, just two days after the climax of the 2009 Formula One season in Abu Dhabi at the Yas Marina Circuit, with the Driver's Cup being contested on Wednesday 4, November.

The new dates affected the United States and Australia the worst, since it meant drivers from those countries' popular saloon-car series (V8 Supercar and NASCAR Sprint Cup Series) could not participate in the event.  Jamie Whincup of Team Vodafone was originally selected to participate but could not because of the schedule, so two motorcyclists were used on the team.  In the past, the United States team has used Nationwide Series champion Carl Edwards, and four-time Sprint Cup Series champion Jeff Gordon and Jimmie Johnson.  Two X Games stars and Rally America drivers were chosen.

Mattias Ekström won the World Final for Team Scandinavia, while Sebastian Vettel and Michael Schumacher won the Nations Cup for Team Germany.

South Europe Regional Final

For the first ever time, regional finals were held to determine which nations will take part in Beijing. The first of these regional finals was for South Europe, featuring Portugal, Spain, Monaco and Italy. It was held in the Estádio do Dragão, the home of F.C. Porto on 6/7 June.

ROC Portugal
Miguel Barbosa won the ROC Portugal opener and was joined by A1 Grand Prix driver Filipe Albuquerque, José Pedro Fontes and team captain and Production World Rally Championship Armindo Araújo in the Portuguese team.

ROC Iberia
The Portuguese team faced a Spanish team made up of team captain World Rally Champion Carlos Sainz, Citroën WRC driver Dani Sordo, World Series by Renault driver Jaime Alguersuari and rally driver Sergio Vallejo in the ROC Iberia. Albuquerque beat Sordo by two heats to nil in the Iberian final.

ROC South Europe Finals
The Spanish pairing of Sainz and Sordo faced the Italian pairing of former World Rally champion Miki Biasion and current WRC driver Gigi Galli in the first semi-final. Spain won by three heats to nil. The Portuguese pairing of Albuquerque and Araujo faced Monaco, featuring A1GP driver Clivio Piccione and Le Mans 24 Hours winner Emanuele Pirro, who although born in Italy, has been a resident of Monaco for over 22 years. After four of five heats the score was balanced at 2–2, before Piccione beat Albuquerque by one ten thousandth of a second, the narrowest margin of victory in Race of Champions history. The Monegasque pairing beat the Spanish pair by three heats to one in the final to send Monaco through to the main event in November.

ROC Legends
There was also a RoC Legends competition on the Saturday evening, featuring Sainz, Biasion, Pirro, Johnny Herbert, Heinz-Harald Frentzen, Mick Doohan, Andy Priaulx and Pedro Chaves. Priaulx beat Herbert in the Legends final by two heats to one.

Participants

 Jamie Whincup originally was confirmed to participate, but later withdrew due to a scheduling conflict with the V8 Supercars Championship. Chad Reed took his place.
 The two fastest Chinese drivers in the ROC China Challenge would represent their nation in the Nations Cup.

Cars
 Ford Focus RS WRC
 KTM X-Bow
 ROC Car
 RX Racing RX150
 Solution F Prototype
 Volkswagen Scirocco

ROC China

ROC Nations Cup

Group A

Group B

Group C

Knockout stages

Semifinals

Final

World Final

Round 1

Group A

Group B

Group C

Group D

Knockout stages

Final

References

External links

Race of Champions
Race of Champions
Race of Champions
Race of Champions
Race of Champions
Race of Champions